The 1967 Trans-American Championship was the second running of the Sports Car Club of America's Trans-Am Series. After the dominance of Alfa Romeo in the under 2000cc class in 1966, Porsche would rise to prominence, starting a dynasty that would last for several years. 1967 would also mark the debut of Mercury, with Dan Gurney winning at Green Valley for the company in its new Cougar. David Pearson would also win in a Cougar at Riverside later that year. Ford and Mercury would both end the year strongly, with four wins apiece. Mark Donohue would provide the first win in the series for Chevrolet at Marlboro Speedway. He would go on to win at Stardust and Pacific Raceways, igniting the Ford vs Chevy rivalry that made the series legendary. 

Ford won the Over 2 Liter class and Porsche the Under 2 Liter class.

Schedule
Overall winner in bold.

 Classes ran separate races at Marlboro.

Championships
Points were awarded according to finishing position. Only the highest-placed car scored points for the manufacturer. Only the best 9 finishes counted towards the championship. Drivers' championships were not awarded in Trans-Am until 1972.

Over 2.0L manufacturers

Under 2.0L manufacturers

See also
1967 Can-Am season
1967 United States Road Racing Championship season

References

Trans-Am Series
Transam
Transam